The 1984 Tour de Suisse was the 48th edition of the Tour de Suisse cycle race and was held from 13 June to 22 June 1984. The race started in Urdorf and finished in Zürich. The race was won by Urs Zimmermann of the Cilo–Aufina team.

General classification

References

1984
Tour de Suisse
June 1984 sports events in Europe
1984 Super Prestige Pernod International